The 2022 Vilnius Open, branded as Vilnius Open by kevin. for sponsorship reasons, was a professional tennis tournament played on indoor hard courts. It was the first edition of the tournament which was part of the 2022 ATP Challenger Tour. It took place in Vilnius, Lithuania between 17 and 23 October 2022.

Singles main draw entrants

Seeds

 1 Rankings are as of 10 October 2022.

Other entrants
The following players received wildcards into the singles main draw:
  Edas Butvilas
  Vilius Gaubas
  Ainius Sabaliauskas

The following player received entry into the singles main draw as a special exempt:
  Matteo Arnaldi

The following player received entry into the singles main draw as an alternate:
  Viktor Durasovic

The following players received entry from the qualifying draw:
  Elliot Benchetrit
  Cem İlkel
  Mark Lajal
  Jules Marie
  David Poljak
  Mats Rosenkranz

The following player received entry as a lucky loser:
  Térence Atmane

Champions

Singles

  Mattia Bellucci def.  Cem İlkel 1–6, 6–3, 7–5.

Doubles

  Romain Arneodo /  Tristan-Samuel Weissborn def.  Dan Added /  Théo Arribagé 6–4, 5–7, [10–5].

References

Vilnius Open
Vilnius Open
2022 in Lithuanian sport
October 2022 sports events in Europe